The 4th edition of the annual Holland Ladies Tour was held from September 2 to September 7, 2001 in Dronten.

Stages

2001-09-02: Dronten — Dronten (140 km)

2001-09-03: Leiden — Leiden (116 km)

2001-09-04: Oss — Oss (106 km)

2001-09-05: Haaften — Haaften (125 km)

2001-09-06: Bergeijk — Bergeijk (85 km)

2001-09-06: Bergeijk — Bergeijk (27 km)

2001-09-07: Heerlen — Heerlen (83 km)

Final standings

General classification

Points classification

Mountains classification

Best Young Rider classification

Sprint classification

Teams 
 Acca Due O
 Team Farm Frites-Hartol
 Nationale Selectie KNWU
 Saturn Cycling Team
 German National Team
 Belgian National Team
 Vlaanderen T-Interim
 Albertsvrienden
 Team Sponsorservice
 Konica (Czech Rep.)
 Ondernemers van Nature
 Westland Wil Vooruit
 Ton v Bemmelen/Novilon
 Brabant 2000 reg. select
 BIK-Toscany Sport

References 
 cyclingnews

2001
Holland Ladies Tour
Holland Ladies Tour
Cycling in North Brabant
Cycling in South Holland
Cycling in Bergeijk
Cycling in Dronten
Cycling in Heerlen
Cycling in West Betuwe
Sport in Leiden
Sport in Oss